Song of the Thin Man is a 1947 murder mystery-comedy directed by Edward Buzzell. The sixth and final film in MGM's Thin Man series, starring William Powell and Myrna Loy as Nick and Nora Charles, characters created by Dashiell Hammett. Nick Jr. is played by Dean Stockwell. Phillip Reed, Keenan Wynn, Gloria Grahame, and Jayne Meadows are featured in this story set in the world of nightclub musicians.

Plot
A charity benefit sponsored by David Thayar is staged aboard the S.S. Fortune, Phil Brant's gambling ship. The entertainment is provided by a jazz band led by Tommy Drake and featuring singer Fran Page and talented but unstable clarinetist Buddy Hollis.

After a set, Drake informs a displeased Brant that he is quitting, having gotten a much better booking through Mitchell Talbin. However, Drake has a problem: he owes gangster Al Amboy $12,000. When Amboy (who is at the party) hears the news, he demands full payment that night. Drake begs Talbin to give him an advance, but Talbin is unwilling to part with such a large sum. In desperation, Drake sneaks into Brant's office and opens the safe, when he is shot from behind and killed.

Brant and socialite Janet Thayar elope, as her father David disapproves of Brant's lower-class background. The next morning, they show up at Nick and Nora Charles's apartment, having learned that Brant is the prime suspect in the murder. When a bullet narrowly misses Brant, Nick turns him in to the police, having decided it is safer for all concerned. Then Nick starts investigating.

Sneaking aboard the Fortune, Nick discovers on the back of a sheet of music a receipt signed by Amboy acknowledging that Drake's debt had been paid. Nick then runs into Drake's band, allowed back on board to collect their instruments. When he questions them, he learns that the bandleader had many enemies, among them Buddy Hollis. Musician Clarence "Clinker" Krause agrees to help Nick track Buddy down, but they have no luck.

Nick and Nora visit a hostile Janet. The bullet that killed Drake likely came from an antique gun, and Nick knows Janet's father is an avid collector. Nick finds that one gun is missing from Mr. Thayar's collection. Janet leaves after getting a telephone call. Nick and Nora follow her to Fran's apartment where they find Fran's body, recently stabbed in the back. Janet claims Fran called to sell her some information, but that she arrived after Fran was killed.

Nick finds a matchbook from a hotel in Poughkeepsie that eventually leads him to a sanitarium where Buddy is undergoing treatment. The musician is too badly shaken to answer Nick's questions, though Nora's presence seems to calm him down. When Nora sneaks back later by herself, Buddy becomes agitated, confesses to the murder, pulls out the antique gun, and tries to shoot Nora but misses. Nick does not believe the deranged man's confession as Drake was slain by a well-aimed shot.

Nick gathers all the suspects by arranging a party on the reopened Fortune and announces that Buddy has fully recovered and that he will reveal the murderer's identity that night. It is Nora who notices the crucial clue: Amboy's wife shows up wearing a valuable necklace that matches the earrings owned by Mitchell Talbin's wife, Phyllis. Sometime later, the necklace mysteriously reappears on Phyllis's neck. When Nick confronts Mitchell, Phyllis reveals that it was she who paid off her lover Drake's debt using the necklace. As Nick prompts Buddy to finger the killer, Mitchell confesses to both killings and pulls out a gun. An enraged Phyllis shoots him first, but her husband is only wounded. Despite Nick's pleas to desist, she fires repeatedly, finishing the job.

Cast
 William Powell as Nick Charles
 Myrna Loy as Nora Charles
 Keenan Wynn as Clarence "Clinker" Krause
 Dean Stockwell as Nick Charles Jr. 
 Phillip Reed as Tommy Edlon Drake (as Philip Reed)
 Patricia Morison as Phyllis Talbin
 Leon Ames as Mitchell Talbin
 Gloria Grahame as Fran Ledue Page (singing voice was dubbed by Carol Arden)
 Jayne Meadows as Janet Thayar
 Ralph Morgan as David I. Thayar
 Bess Flowers as Jessica Thayar
 Don Taylor as Buddy Hollis
 Warner Anderson as Dr. Monolaw
 Bruce Cowling as Phil Orval Brant
 Connie Gilchrist as Bertha, the Charleses' housekeeper
 Henry Nemo as The Neem
 William Bishop as Al Amboy
 Marie Windsor as Helen Amboy
 James Burke as Captain Callahan

Production
This Thin Man film differs in several respects from the others in the series and was one of two films in the series not directed by W. S. Van Dyke, who died in 1943. The script was one of three not written by the husband and wife team of Albert Hackett and Frances Goodrich, who had worked with Dashiell Hammett to develop the Nick and Nora characters earlier in the series.

It was the last film of Myrna Loy with MGM.

Reception
According to MGM records, the film earned $1,403,000 in the US and Canada and $902,000 elsewhere, resulting in a loss of $128,000.

The film was the last of six based on the characters of Nick and Nora Charles:
 The Thin Man (1934)
 After the Thin Man (1936)
 Another Thin Man (1939)
 Shadow of the Thin Man (1941)
 The Thin Man Goes Home (1945)
 Song of the Thin Man (1947)

References

External links
 
 
 
 

1947 films
1947 crime films
1947 comedy films
1940s crime comedy films
1947 mystery films
American black-and-white films
American comedy thriller films
American crime comedy films
American detective films
American sequel films
1940s English-language films
Films directed by Edward Buzzell
Films set in New York City
Metro-Goldwyn-Mayer films
The Thin Man films
Films about music and musicians
1940s American films